Dick W. Emuchay  (5 August 1919 – 8 May 1995), also referred to as "Sir D. W. Emuchay", was a British-Nigerian medical doctor and administrator. He served as the first chairman of the Public Service Commission of the East Central State. In 1981, Samuel Onunaka Mbakwe, Governor of Imo State, appointed Emuchay as the Pro-Chancellor and Chairman Governing Council of the newly created Imo State University, later Abia State University He served in that position until 1985. He is reputed to have set up the first privately run rural hospital, when in 1961 he set up a 180-bed cottage hospital in his home town of Azumini, in Ukwa East, Abia State.

The first medical doctor from Azumini, Emuchay was unanimously elected the first national chairman of the Azumini Welfare Association during the association's inaugural meeting on 30 December 1958. He also played a role in establishing the National Secondary School, Azumini.

Early life
Emuchay was born in Abak, Akwa Ibom State in eastern Nigeria, and he attended Government College Umuahia, 1932 - 1934
King's College, Lagos, 1935-1936
Higher College, Yaba Lagos 1937-1942
University of St Andrews, Scotland 1945-1949
Liverpool School of Tropical Medicine, England (Diploma in Tropical Medicine and Hygiene). He took his examination in 1953.

Professional career
He taught biology at Igbobi College, Yaba, before proceeding to St. Andrews University Scotland and Liverpool School of Tropical Medicine. He practised medicine briefly in the United Kingdom both as a general practitioner and house Surgeon before relocating back to Nigeria.

 Senior Science Master, Igbobi College, Lagos
 General Medical Practitioner, Lancashire, England, 1949
 House Surgeon, Lancashire, England, 1950
 Senior House Surgeon, Lancashire, England, 1952
 Medical Officer-in-charge of Rural Areas, Aba, 1955-1958
 Medical Officer-in-charge, General Hospital, Degema, Rivers State, 1958-1959
 Medical Officer-in-charge, Maternity Hospital, Aba, 1959-1961

In 1961, D. W. Emuchay became the Proprietor and Medical Superintendent, Cottage Hospital, Azumini which he founded. Years later, his son Dr. Chika O. Emuchay established the Group Medical Practice (GMP) at No. 1 Emuchay Close, Ogbor hill, Aba to provide support to Cottage Hospital, Azumini.
 Chairman, Public Service Commission, East Central State, Enugu, 1972–76
 Chairman, Public Service Commission, former Imo State, Owerri, 1976–82
 Pro-Chancellor and Chairman of the Governing Council, former Imo State University, now Abia State University, Uturu, Nigeria 1982-1985
In 1986, the federal government conferred on him a national honour, the award of Member of the Federal Republic.

Family
D. W. Emuchay married Christiana Nne Alali in 1956 at St Michael and All Angels Anglican Church Aba, Abia State. He is the father of 8 including Nigerian diplomat and former Consul-General to South Africa, Okey Emuchay, MFR.

References

1919 births
2011 deaths
Medical doctors from Akwa Ibom State
Government College Umuahia alumni
King's College, Lagos alumni
Alumni of the University of St Andrews
20th-century Nigerian medical doctors
Nigerian expatriates in the United Kingdom